Foot washing is the act of cleansing one's feet.

Foot washing may also refer to:
 Maundy (foot washing), a religious rite involving foot washing observed by various Christian denominations
 Wudu, the Islamic procedure for cleansing parts of the body which involves foot washing